Adílio is a Brazilian masculine given name.

Notable people with the name include
Adílio de Oliveira Gonçalves, "Adílio" (1956) Brazilian footballer
Blessed Adílio Daronch (1908-1924) Brazilian teenager

Additionally in the Portuguese language Wikipedia
:pt:Adílio Martins Viana, Brazilian politician

References

Portuguese masculine given names